Saman Salur (born 1976) is an Iranian film director and screenwriter. He graduated from Soore University with a Bachelor of Film and Television in Directing.

He is known for directing and writing the comedy feature 'A Few Kilos of Dates for a Funeral' 2006 winning Golden Leopard and Special Prize of the Jury at Locarno International Film Festival, a special Jury from Sofia International Film Festival and a Montgolfiere from the Three Continents Festival. His first documentary 'Residents of Silent Land' won award in Molodist Kiev International Film Festival.
His last movie "We will say Amen" has been banned for 4 years till 2016.

Filmography 
 The Wind Will Comb Your Tresses, 2002 (Short Film)
 IT’S A SONY, 2002 (Documentary)
 The Guilty, 2002 (Cinematography)
 From Land of Silence, 2004
 A Few Kilos of Dates for a Funeral, 2006
 Aramesh ba Diazepam 10, 2005 (Documentary)
 Lonely Tune of Tehran, 2008
 Stories on Human Rights, 2008
 Be Hadaf Shelik Kon, 2011 (Writer)
 Thirteen 59, 2011
 We Will Say Amen, 2012 (New edition has been released on 2016)
 Raspberries, 2013
 Puff Puff Pass, 2020
 Killing a Traitor, 2022

Awards 
 Winner of the Jury Special Mention - Sofia International Film Festival 2005
 Winner of the FIPRESCI Award of the Jury - Molodist Kiev International Film Festival 2005
 Golden Leopard - Locarno International Film Festival 2006
 Won Best Film and Director - Edinburgh International Film Festival 2006
 Special Award - Batumi International Art-House Film Festival 2009

See also 
 Cinema of Iran
 Fajr International Film Festival

References

External links 
 

Soore University alumni
Iranian film directors
Persian-language film directors
Iranian screenwriters
Iranian film editors
1976 births
Living people
People from Borujerd